Tangerine is the debut studio album by Chilean DJ Shanti Celeste. It was released on 15 November 2019 under Celeste's own label, Peach Discs.

Critical reception
Tangerine was met with universal acclaim reviews from critics. At Metacritic, which assigns a weighted average rating out of 100 to reviews from mainstream publications, this release received an average score of 82, based on 6 reviews.

Accolades

Track listing

References

2019 debut albums